National Tourist Routes are eighteen highways in Norway designated by the Norwegian Public Roads Administration for their picturesque scenery and tourist-friendly infrastructure, such as rest stops and viewpoints. The routes cover  and are located along the West Coast, in Northern Norway and in the mountains of Southern Norway. The authorities have coordinated the establishment of accommodation, cultural activities, dining, sale of local arts and crafts, and natural experiences along the tourist roads. The overall goal of the project is to increase tourism in the rural areas through which the roads run.

The project started in 1994 and was initially limited to Sognefjellsvegen, Gamle Strynefjellsveg, Hardanger and the Helgeland Coast Route. These were officially designated National Tourist Routes in 1997, and, the following year, the Storting decided to expand the project. Municipalities were asked to nominate roads, resulting in 52 nominees covering . Eighteen routes were selected in 2004, with the goal of completing the necessary upgrades and officially opening them as National Tourist Routes by 2015. The upgrades are estimated to cost 800 million Norwegian kroner (ca. €100 million). This includes building resting places, parking lots, viewpoints, and clearing vegetation. The Public Roads Administration's aim is that use of design will enhance the visitors' experience. While most of the architecture has been designed by young Norwegians, French-American Louise Bourgeois and Swiss Peter Zumthor have designed stops in Varanger and Ryfylke. Artworks have been installed at selected viewpoints, including one by American fine artist Mark Dion. All routes were signposted and officially designated by 2012. That year, the architecture magazine Topos awarded the project a special prize for its use of architecture, and particularly noted that it was a public-sector focus on aesthetic design.

Two routes constitute part of the International E-road network: E10 through Lofoten and E75 through Varanger. Mountain pass roads, such as Sognefjellsvegen, Valdresflye and Trollstigen, are closed during winter. Both sections of the Helgeland Coast Route have two ferries in them, while there is one ferry on Geiranger–Trollstigen and three each on the routes through Ryfylke and Hardanger. The Andøya and Senja routes are connected via the Andenes–Gryllefjord Ferry.

List of routes
The following is a list of National Tourist Routes in Norway that have officially opened or have been approved and are under upgrade. It contains the name of the road, the start and finish locations of the route, the county or counties the route runs through, the road numbers the route follows, the length of the road and a description.

References

External links
 Official Website

 
Roads in Norway
Lists of tourist attractions in Norway
1994 establishments in Norway